Bartosz Kwiecień (born 7 May 1994) is a Polish professional footballer who plays as a centre-back or a defensive midfielder for Polish club Korona Kielce.

Career

Jagiellonia Białystok
On 27 July 2017, Kwiecień signed a four-year contract with Jagiellonia Białystok. Bartosz debuted for Jagiellonia on 17 July 2017 against Zagłębie Lubin. He scored his first goal for the club on 12 December 2017 against Korona Kielce in a 5–1 victory.

Loan to Arka Gdynia
On 5 August 2020, he was loaned to Arka Gdynia.

Statistics

Club
 As of 24 August 2017

External links

References

1994 births
People from Starachowice
Sportspeople from Świętokrzyskie Voivodeship
Living people
Polish footballers
Poland youth international footballers
Association football defenders
Korona Kielce players
Górnik Łęczna players
Chrobry Głogów players
Jagiellonia Białystok players
Arka Gdynia players
Resovia (football) players
Ekstraklasa players
I liga players
III liga players